= Arang Keshavarzian =

Iranian-American academic (born 1973)

Arang Keshavarzian (born March 21, 1973) is an Iranian-American academic and author. He is a Professor of Middle Eastern and Islamic Studies at New York University. His research focuses on the political economy of Iran and the Persian Gulf region. He is the author of Bazaar and State in Iran: The Politics of the Tehran Marketplace (2007) and the award-winning Making Space for the Gulf: Histories of Regionalism and the Middle East (2024).

== Early life and education ==
Keshavarzian was born in Iran on March 21, 1973, and was raised in the United States. He holds a Ph.D. in Political Science from Princeton University, which he received in 2003.

== Career ==
Keshavarzian began his academic career as an Assistant Professor in Political Science at Concordia University in Montreal. He later joined New York University (NYU), where he is currently a Professor of Middle Eastern and Islamic Studies. He has also served as the Chair of the Department of Middle Eastern and Islamic Studies.

His teaching and research explore the politics and political economy of the modern Middle East, with a particular focus on Iran, the Persian Gulf, and the Arabian Peninsula. He has written on topics including the relationship between spatialization, capitalism, and political power.

== Selected publications ==
=== Books ===
- Bazaar and State in Iran: The Politics of the Tehran Marketplace. Cambridge University Press, 2007.
- Global 1979: Geographies and Histories of the Iranian Revolution (co-editor with Ali Mirsepassi). Cambridge University Press, 2021.
- Making Space for the Gulf: Histories of Regionalism and the Middle East. Stanford University Press, 2024.

=== Selected articles ===
His articles have appeared in academic journals including Geopolitics, Journal of Church and State, International Journal of Middle East Studies, Middle East Report (MERIP), International Journal of Urban and Regional Research, and the New York Review of Books.

== Awards and recognition ==
- 2025 Roger Owen Book Award, Middle East Studies Association, for Making Space for the Gulf: Histories of Regionalism and the Middle East.
- Honorable Mention, 2025 Association for Gulf and Arabian Peninsula Studies (AGAPS) Biennial Book Award.
